The Greater Manchester Army Cadet Force (GMACF) is the county cadet force for Greater Manchester, which forms part of the wider Army Cadet Force, a youth organisation in the United Kingdom that offers learning and experiences around a military training theme. It is home to between 1400-1750 cadets and 200-230 adult volunteers in 45-47 detachments.

History 
In 1863, along with the formation of the Volunteer Force, the first government sanctioned cadet groups were allowed to be formed.  These groups would mostly be formed in connection with existing volunteer companies and battalions.  Following the Territorial and Reserve Forces Act 1907 which organised the former Volunteer Force into a coherent organisation, known as the Territorial Force (TF), the cadets were expanded.  Each company consisted of no less than 30 cadets, and four of these companies formed a "Cadet Battalion", the predecessors to the modern "Cadet County".

Unlike their modern successors, the first cadet battalions were administered by their local County Territorial Force Associations, and rarely ever came under an "army command".  However, following changes to the organisation of the Cadets, in 1923 all cadet forces were taken under complete control of the County Associations.

The first mention of the modern Greater Manchester Army Cadet Force appears in the 19th November 1974 edition of the London Gazette.

Organisation
The organisation of the Greater Manchester Army Cadet Force is as follows in 2021:

</onlyinclude>

ACF Mission 
The Army Cadet Force is a national, voluntary, uniformed youth organisation. It is sponsored by the British Army but not part of it and neither the cadets nor the adult volunteer leaders are subject to military call-up.  They offer a broad range of challenging adventurous and educational activities, some of them on a military theme. Their aim is to inspire young people to achieve success in life and develop in them the qualities of a good citizen.

The ACF can be compared to their counterparts in the Junior Reserve Officers' Training Corps (USA), Hong Kong Adventure Corps, and Canadian Army Cadets, amongst others.

See also

 List of Army Cadet Force units
 Combined Cadet Force

References

External links
armycadets.com/county/greater-manchester-acf, Greater Manchester Army Cadet Force Official Website
armycadetsgreatermanchester.wordpress.com, The Official GMACF Blog
 https://www.facebook.com/GreaterManchesterACF  The County Facebook Page

British Army training
Youth organisations based in England
Army cadet organisations
British Cadet organisations
Education in Greater Manchester
Organisations based in Bury, Greater Manchester
Army Cadet Force counties